Movistar Team may refer to:

Movistar Team (men's team), a professional cycling team that competes on the UCI World Tour
Movistar Team (women's team), a professional cycling team that competes on the UCI Women's World Tour
Movistar Team (Continental Team), a Colombian developmental cycling team that competes on UCI Continental circuits
Movistar Team Ecuador, an Ecuadorian developmental cycling team that competes on UCI Continental circuits